Pogăniș River may refer to:

 Pogăniș, a river in western Romania, tributary of the Timiș
 Pogăniș River (Bega), a small river in western Romania, tributary of the Săraz (Bega basin)